Oy Nautor AB is a Finnish producer of luxury sailing yachts, based in Jakobstad. It is known for its Nautor's Swan range of yachts models. The company was founded in 1966 by Pekka Koskenkylä.

The designers 
Nautor has worked with four naval architects during its history.

The original designer Sparkman & Stephens had a long association with Nautor and were responsible for the first 775 yachts sold. These early designs combined a luxurious interior in a fiberglass hull with features that were then current in successful racing boats, such as the separation of the skeg-hung rudder from the keel. They won numerous races including the Cowes Week in 1968, the Bermuda Race in 1972 by Swan 48, followed by even bigger success in 1974, when a ketch rigged Swan 65 by the name Sayula II won the first ever Whitbread Round the World Race. In 2016, this adventure was presented in a documentary film, The Weekend Sailor.

During the mid to late 1970s the designs from the American company were not as successful on the race course. Ron Holland started his tenure as designer for Nautor's Swan in the late 1970s, creating six models of which 283 yachts were sold.

In the 1980s, Nautor's Swan entered a new era with the appointment of Argentinian Germán Frers as designer.  Over 900 yachts have been produced so far. The yard has continued to stay with Frers, and the hull designs have continued to follow modern trends. However the brand has moved away from its production cruiser/racer background into luxury high end larger cruising yachts.

To mark the companies 50th Anniversary a design tender led to Nautor working with Juan Kouyoumdjian on the aggressively modern looking ClubSwan 50 to showcase the brand.

Additional architects have collaborated with Frers in terms of styling. Most notably Andrew Winch on the styling of the Swan 36 Frers and Swan 44 Mk I. Beiderbeck Design came up with the overall concept and interior for the Swan 105 which at this size is almost semi custom.

Nautor have also built yachts to Luca Brenta and Bill Tripp designs.

Ownership 
In late 1969 the assembly hall of the Nautor's Swan boat yard burnt to the ground, destroying a dozen hulls in various stages of production.  As a result, Pekka Koskenkylä was forced to sell stakes of Nautor's Swan to Wilhelm Schauman Oy (UPM) in order to finance the rebuilding of the yard and to restart production.

From 1998 on, Italian businessman Leonardo Ferragamo and a group of investors have controlled and managed Nautor's Swan, continuing to push forward innovations and changes intended to place Swan yachts at the forefront of the international sailing world.

The Nautor yard 
Since the foundation of the company in 1966, a little over 2,000 Swan yachts have been produced, ranging from 36 to 131 feet in length.  The firm employs about 400 staff, and an almost similar number of indirect staff.

The historical plant in Kållby, just outside Jakobstad, is dedicated to plug and mould fabrication and the lamination of all Swans' hulls, using an advanced and fully computerized milling machine to shape the moulds.  Another part of the plant is dedicated to the assembly of the smaller size yachts. The Kållby plant also includes an in-door water facility to test the yachts prior to delivery.

In 2002, a new yard, close to the sea, has been opened in Jakobstad.  The new yard is dedicated to the assembly of "Maxi" Swan Yachts, from the "Swan 60" to the "Swan 115".

The third plant is in Kronoby, close to Jakobstad, and it is here that expert carpenters work, dedicated to the hand-made preparation of the wood interiors, which have become a feature of all Swan yachts.  A sample of the wood of each yacht is kept at the factory so that an exact replacement could be made if required.

In August 2012, a Swan 90S named Freya was the 2000th Swan to be built and launched by the yard.

Club Swan
Club Swan is a non-profit organization whose members are present, past and future Swan yacht owners.  The club house is located at the Segelsällskapet Yacht Club in Jakobstad, Finland. Leonardo Ferragamo is the chairman of the club.  Among the honorary members are the former King Juan Carlos I of Spain, Pekka Koskenkylä, German Frers, Ron Holland and Lady Pippa Blake, wife of deceased Peter Blake.

The highlight of the racing calendar for Swan owners is the biennial "Rolex Swan Cup", held in Porto Cervo, Sardinia in association with the Yacht Club Costa Smeralda, which traditionally embodies "The Spirit of Swan" in its glamour and quality of sailing. Since 2013, a "Rolex Swan Cup Caribbean" regatta has been held at the Yacht Club Costa Smeralda's clubhouse in the British Virgin Islands.  This event at Virgin Gorda is held on alternate years to the Mediterranean one. Two other well known biennial events have been the "Swan European Regatta", usually taking place in the waters of Cowes in association with the Royal Yacht Squadron; and the "Swan American Regatta" taking place in the waters of Newport Rhode Island, in association with the New York Yacht Club.

In 2017, The Nations Trophy was launched as a biennial event to promote Swan one design racing between nations. The regatta is open to ClubSwan 50s, Swan 45s and ClubSwan 42s. Various European and World Championships, between the individual one design classes, have also been incorporated into this competition.

The ClubSwan is a brand based yacht club that also organises and runs a series of annual cruising rendezvous and regattas. Together with helping promote develop the ClubSwan 36 and Clubswan 50 and previously the ClubSwan 42, Swan 45, Swan 601, Swan 60 OD and the "Swan Maxi Class".

Current Swan line
Nautor is globally recognised as a producer of exquisitely crafted yachts capable of offering style and performance.  Apart from the recently announced ClubSwan 36 and ClubSwan50 models designed by Juan Kouyoumdjian, the current range of Swan yachts are all designed by fellow Argentinian yacht designer Germán Frers. The larger models (from the Swan 60 upwards) are sometimes available in either flush deck (FD), semi-raised saloon (S) or raised saloon (RS) versions. With the 90 ft model being semi custom designs.

Current Swan line – model sizes (imperial)
LOA: Length Overall, LWL: Length of Waterline, Beam: Width, Draft: Underwater Depth, Disp: Displacement, Ballast: Leverage Weight, Ratio: Ballast/Displacement, I: Headsail Height, J: Fore-Triangle Length, P: Mainsail Height, E: Mainsail Length, Main: Mainsail Area, Gen: Genoa Area, SA: Working Sail Area, Spin: Spinnaker Area

Current Swan Line – Model Sizes (Metric)

Nautor Swan production history

Swan production yachts

Swan production yacht models are listed below:

(CC = Centre Cockpit; FD = Flush Deck; RS = Raised Saloon; S = Semi-Raised Saloon; DH = Deck House) (Current Swanline in bold)

Swan marketed yachts

One-off – custom yachts

Motorsailers & motorboats

See also
 List of sailboat designers and manufacturers
 List of large sailing yachts

External links

 Nautor's Swan
 S&S Swan Owners Association
 Association of the Owners of Classic Swans designed by German Frers
 Swan 42 Class Association
 Swan 45 Class Association
 Gazprom Swan 60 Class Association
 A quick look at the very first Swan (S&S Swan 36)

References

Jakobstad
Nautor Swan